Lord James Beauclerk ( – 20 October 1787) was an Anglican clergyman who served as the Bishop of Hereford from 1746 to 1787.

Education
He was the eighth son of Charles Beauclerk, 1st Duke of St Albans and Lady Diana de Vere. He was educated John Roysse's Free School in Abingdon (now Abingdon School) and later at The Queen's College, Oxford, graduating B.A., 1730, M.A., 1733, B.D. and D.D. by diploma, 2 July 1744.

Career
He was Deputy Clerk of the Closet from 1745 to 1746.

James was a canon of St George's Chapel, Windsor when he was nominated bishop of the Diocese of Hereford on 8 April 1746. His consecration took place on 11 May 1746.

He was a Steward of the OA Club in 1745. He died unmarried on 20 October 1787, aged about 78.

Ancestry

See also

 List of Old Abingdonians

References 

1709 births
1787 deaths
Alumni of The Queen's College, Oxford
18th-century Church of England bishops
Bishops of Hereford
Canons of Windsor
Younger sons of dukes
James
Deputy Clerks of the Closet
People educated at Abingdon School